Eugene Louis Handley (November 25, 1914 – April 12, 2009) was an American professional baseball player and scout. Born in Kennett, Missouri, he was a versatile player during his pro career (1935–1942; 1944–1954) who spent two seasons in Major League Baseball as a utility infielder for the – Philadelphia Athletics. He was the younger brother of Lee Handley and attended Bradley University.

Gene Handley spent ten seasons in minor league baseball before winning a job with the 1946 Athletics. He broke into the professional game as an outfielder, but he soon converted to a third baseman, and also played second base and shortstop in the minors. In 125 MLB games played — 85 at second base, 14 at third base and two at shortstop — Handley was a .252 hitter (86-for-341) with 10 doubles, six triples, 41 runs, 29 RBI, and nine stolen bases. After his playing career, Handley was a minor league manager, then a longtime scout, for the Chicago Cubs, working in the Chicago organization for 54 years and signing players such as 1962 NL Rookie of the Year Ken Hubbs, Dick Ellsworth, Mike Krukow and Pete LaCock. He died in Tucson, Arizona, at the age of 94.

References

External links
Baseball Reference major league profile
Baseball Reference minor league career
Retrosheet
Obituary

1914 births
2009 deaths
Major League Baseball infielders
Philadelphia Athletics players
Major League Baseball scouts
Albany Senators players
Bradley Braves baseball players
Chicago Cubs scouts
Durham Bulls players
Hartford Bees players
Hollywood Stars players
Mount Airy Reds players
Sacramento Solons players
Stockton Ports players
Bradley University alumni
Baseball players from Missouri
People from Kennett, Missouri